Vineet Nayyar, an Indian businessperson, IT executive, was Vice-Chairman, Managing Director and CEO of Tech Mahindra and former chairman of Mahindra Satyam. He is the present Vice-Chairman of IL&FS.

An accomplished leader, he has led several organizations across industries, creating high performance teams and successful businesses. In a career spanning over 40 years, he has worked with the Government, international multilateral agencies and the corporate sector (both public and private).

Education
Nayyar was born in 1939. He has a master's degree in development economics from Williams College, Massachusetts.

Career
An IAS officer (his wife is from the same service), he has worked as a district magistrate, Haryana's rural development secretary and director at the department of economic affairs before heading off to the World Bank where he worked for over 10 years in its energy and infrastructure divisions. Vineet Nayyar became chairman of Mahindra Satyam in 2009.

In the corporate sector, Nayyar was the founding chairman and managing director of the state-owned Gas Authority of India. 
In addition to his responsibilities at Tech Mahindra, Nayyar's principal directorships include his serving as a director on the boards of 
 Venturbay Consultants Private Limited, 
 Mahindra Logisoft Business Solutions Limited, 
 Tech Mahindra (Thailand) Limited, 
 CanvasM Technologies Limited, 
 Tech Mahindra (Beijing) IT Services Limited, 
 Mahindra Holidays and Resorts India Limited, 
 Mahindra United World College of India, 
 Kotak Mahindra Old Mutual Life Insurance Limited, 
 The Great Eastern Shipping Company Limited, 
 Vidya Investments Private Limited, 
 Vidya Education Investment Private Limited,
 Maurya Education Company Private Limited, 
 Tech Mahindra (Americas) Inc, 
 Tech Mahindra GmbH, 
 Mahindra Education Foundation, 
 Tech Mahindra Foundation, 
 Vidya Education Foundation, 
 HPS Social Welfare Foundation and 
 Cathedral Vidya Trust.

In addition to his current responsibilities as vice-chairman of Tech Mahindra, he also serves as a director on the Boards of 
 Great Eastern Shipping, 
 Business Standard, 
 Kotak Life Insurance, 
 The Mahindra United World College of India, 
 The Mahindra Holidays and Resorts India Ltd., and 
 The Tech Mahindra Foundation.

Personal life
He married Reva Nayyar. She is an Retd. IAS officer of 1968 batch from Haryana cadre and holds Post Graduate degree in Political science. She was inducted as a Part-time Non official Director on the Board of BHEL w.e.f. 22 June 2009.  She runs Essel Social Welfare Foundation.

References

External links

Businesspeople in software
Businesspeople from Maharashtra
1939 births
Williams College alumni
Living people